Galilaei is a lunar impact crater located in the western Oceanus Procellarum. Some distance to the southeast is the crater Reiner, while to the south-southwest is Cavalerius. Northeast of the crater is a meandering rille named the Rima Galilaei. To the southeast is the unusual Reiner Gamma formation, a swirling arrangement of light-hued ray-like material.

Galilaei is relatively undistinguished, with a sharp-edged rim that has a higher albedo than the surrounding maria. The inner walls slope down to a ring of debris on the outer edges of the interior floor. There is a small central rise near the midpoint.

About 40 kilometers to the south is the landing site of the Luna 9 robotic probe, the first such vehicle to make a controlled landing on the lunar surface.

Despite being the first person to publish astronomical observations of the Moon with a telescope, Galileo Galilei is honored only with this unremarkable formation.

Initially, the name Galilaeus had been applied by Giovanni Battista Riccioli, an Italian Jesuit who produced one of the first detailed maps of the Moon in 1651, to a large and bright nearby albedo feature (now known as Reiner Gamma). The name was transferred to its present location by Johann Heinrich Mädler in his influential Mappa Selenographica, published in collaboration with Wilhelm Beer in four parts between 1834 and 1836. Mädler's motive for this change was the fact that his lunar map did not name albedo features, forcing him to transfer Galileo's name to an insignificant nearby crater.

Satellite craters
By convention these features are identified on lunar maps by placing the letter on the side of the crater midpoint that is closest to Galilaei.

References

 
 
 
 
 
 
 
 
 
 
 
 

Impact craters on the Moon